The Aquarius Plateau is a physiographic region in the High Plateaus Section of the Colorado Plateau Province. It is located within Garfield and Wayne counties in south-central Utah.

Geography
The plateau, a tectonic uplift on the much larger Colorado Plateau landform, is the highest in Utah.  It is over 900 square miles (2330 km²) of mostly forested highland, much of which is part of Dixie National Forest.

It has over 50,000 acres (200 km²) of rolling hilly terrain above 11,000 feet (3350 m).

Parks
Parks and protected areas on the Aquarius Plateau or its perimeter include Bryce Canyon National Park, Capitol Reef National Park, and the Dixie National Forest.

Section diagram

See also
Markagunt Plateau
Cedar Breaks National Monument
United States physiographic region

References

External links 

Plateaus of Utah
Colorado Plateau
Grand Staircase–Escalante National Monument
Landforms of Garfield County, Utah
Landforms of Wayne County, Utah